Silver State North Solar Project is a 60 MWp (50 MWAC) photovoltaic power station near Primm, Nevada.

Electricity production

See also 

 Silver State South Solar Project
 Solar power in Nevada
 List of power stations in Nevada

References

External links 
 Silver State North Solar Project

Infrastructure completed in 2012
Solar power in the Mojave Desert
Photovoltaic power stations in the United States
Buildings and structures in Clark County, Nevada
Solar power stations in Nevada
2012 establishments in Nevada